The music for the 2013 action role-playing game Lightning Returns: Final Fantasy XIII, developed and published by Square Enix, was composed by Masashi Hamauzu, Naoshi Mizuta, and Mitsuto Suzuki. Hamauzu was the leader composer for XIII and XIII-2, and Mizuta and Suzuki previously composed music for XIII-2. Musicians who had previously worked with the composers on XIII-2 and The 3rd Birthday worked on the project in Japan, while the main soundtrack was performed and recorded in Boston by the Video Game Orchestra, conducted by Shota Nakama. Along with including more percussion and ethnic elements, the soundtrack used "Blinded by Light", the main theme for main character Lightning, as a leitmotif. Unlike the previous XIII games, the soundtrack did not include a theme song, as the composers felt it would detract from the emotional impact of the ending.

Three albums have been released: the promotional Lightning Returns: Final Fantasy XIII Pre Soundtrack in July 2013, the Lightning Returns: Final Fantasy XIII Original Soundtrack in November, and Lightning Returns: Final Fantasy XIII Soundtrack Plus in March 2014. The music has received a mostly positive response from reviewers. The main soundtrack, despite some tracks being critiqued, was generally praised as a good selection of music and a fitting conclusion to the music of the Final Fantasy XIII series. It was also praised by reviewers of the game as a whole. The Soundtrack Plus album was reviewed less favorably. Both commercial albums sold well enough to be placed on the Oricon charts, with the Original Soundtrack reaching #29 and remaining on the charts for four weeks.

Concept and creation

The music of Lightning Returns was composed by Masashi Hamauzu, who composed the music for Final Fantasy XIII, Naoshi Mizuta and Mitsuto Suzuki, who co-composed the music for Final Fantasy XIII-2 with Hamauzu. Japanese band Language was also contracted by Suzuki to help with recording and remixing. Several of the musicians in Japan had worked with the composers before on XIII-2 and The 3rd Birthday. Recording took place at the Mixer's Lab recording studios in Tokyo. The Video Game Orchestra, founded by Shota Nakama, was contracted by Hamauzu to perform, record and mix the orchestral music at their studio on Boston. According to Hamauzu, they were his first and only choice for recording the score. Nakama received the final score in April 2013, and Hamauzu was regularly at the studios to help with the recording process. Nakama was told by Hamauzu that he was allowed to do as he wished unless he did something "really wacky", with Hamauzu relying on Nakama and mostly interacting and working on their tracks if he disliked some aspect of them. The orchestra worked on nearly all of Hamauzu's music, including the opening and ending themes.

The score was created with far more percussion than previous entries in the series, and featured "Blinded by Light", a recurring theme in the XIII games related to the series' central character Lightning, as a leitmotif. The theme was meant to emphasize the focus on Lightning, with several tracks relating directly to her. Unspecified ethnic musical elements were also incorporated. Each composer worked on one of the four game's key locations. Due to the game's day-night cycle, different music was composed for morning, afternoon, evening and nighttime. The thirteen-minute-long final boss theme was meant to reference the title's numeral. Hamauzu wrote "Crimson Blitz", the first piece of the score and one of the game's battle themes, while on tour in Switzerland. Unlike the previous two games, Lightning Returns did not feature a theme song as it was felt that this would diminish the emotional impact of the ending. Instead, the composers created a purely orchestral piece. The final theme, "Epilogue", was co-composed by Hamauzu and Nakama. It was based on the concept of the XIII games coming to an end, and so was intended to convey the themes and atmosphere of the soundtrack. Nakama created multiple versions of the piece and sent them to Hamauzu, who performed alterations and made the final choice. The game also featured multiple musical Easter eggs, including tunes from previous entries in the franchise.

Lightning Returns: Final Fantasy XIII Original Soundtrack

The main soundtrack album, Lightning Returns: Final Fantasy XIII Original Soundtrack, was released on four compact discs on November 21, 2013. It was released by Square Enix under the catalog number SQEX-10392~5, and the album features seventy-four tracks spanning 5:07:27. The first disc is devoted to the opening section and the city of Luxerion; the second disc deals with the Dead Dunes and Wildlands; the third covers the city of Yusnaan and important themes leading up to the game's conclusion; the fourth disc covers the final section of the game. Three tracks from the album, "Crimson Blitz", "The Savior", and "Lightning Returns", were digitally released as singles on iTunes. Further samples from the track were released on a disc of Square Enix music sold as a promotion at Tokyo Game Show 2013. Tracks from Lightning Returns, along with XIII and XIII-2, were also included on a special disc released with the Japan-exclusive "Lightning Ultimate box", a package containing all three XIII games. The soundtrack album reached #29 on the Oricon charts and remained on the charts for four weeks.

Reviews of the album have been positive. Derek Heemsbergen of RPGFan praised the consistency of the soundtrack both when compared to XIII-2 and the variety of locations. He said that the recurring motifs in the soundtrack "work to great effect", noting how the tracks related to Lightning helped explore her personality. His highest praise went to the final disc due to "its sheer emotional intensity". Despite the general praise, some tracks, such as "Marimba de Chocobo", came in for minor critiques. Christopher Huynh of Video Game Music Online was also positive, noting the high production values of the album. He also generally praised the themes used both in battle and for the various locations, though he felt that the Dead Dunes tracks were the weakest on the album. His reaction to the new and rearranged characters' themes were more mixed, with him praising "Snow's Theme" while calling "Fang's Theme" a "very odd and jarring failure". The final disc also received high praise, with Huynn saying that it "succeeds at closing out the series on an emotional high".

Reviewers of the game also noted and praised the soundtrack, despite giving more mixed opinions on other aspects of the game. Jeremy Parish, writing for USGamer, called the music "phenomenal from start to finish". Destructoids Dale North called the music "fantastic, and even more varied than the previous Final Fantasy XIII games". Bradley Hale of Hardcore Gamer was also positive, saying that the music "does an effective job at blending old jams with new ones, with the arrangements of already known songs being interesting, and new tunes coming off as far more inspiring and emotion-filled than those found in XIII-2".

Track list

Lightning Returns: Final Fantasy XIII Original Soundtrack Plus

A bonus album, Lightning Returns: Final Fantasy XIII Soundtrack Plus, was released on March 26, 2014. The album features remixes of tracks from the main album or tracks present in the game that were not released on the album. The remixes were done by Mizuta, Suzuki, Kengo Tokusashi, Wollny Andreas, Hiroshi Kaneko. Released under the catalog number SQEX-10430, the album features 25 tracks with a total running time of 1:13:31. The album reached #211 on the Oricon charts, remaining there for one week.

RPGFans Neal Chandran was mostly negative regarding the album. He called the majority of tracks "just plain boring", while he felt that the more exciting tunes "lack punch". Some pieces such as "Captive Saint" he called "superficially pretty, but that's really it", while the remixes of music pieces by Uematsu he called "brief, but awful". Huynh shared many points of criticism with Chandran, finding multiple tracks boring as they were just slight variations on tracks from the main soundtrack album, though some tracks such as "Dying World" and the piano version of "Serah's Theme" were praised.

Lightning Returns: Final Fantasy XIII Pre Soundtrack

A promotional album, Lightning Returns: Final Fantasy XIII Pre Soundtrack, was released on July 13, 2013. It contains six tracks from the game, three of which did not yet have an official title. The other three were the tracks that had then received a digital release. The album was available at a special Square Enix event at United States of Odaiba 2013 as a limited promotion for Lightning Returns.

References

Final Fantasy music
Video game soundtracks
Video game music discographies
Final Fantasy XIII